Repel is a commune in the Vosges department in Grand Est in northeastern France.

References

Communes of Vosges (department)